Adam Podgórecki (1925–1998) was a sociologist and one of the founders of the Research Committee on Sociology of Law. Podgórecki was also one of the founders of the first institute at Warsaw University which was devoted to the social scientific studies of law. He moved to Carlton University in Ottawa, Canada, and took up a Chair in sociology and anthropology, when the communists expelled him from his professorship for "anti-communist academic activities". "He worked tirelessly and fearlessly" to ensure the independence of the sociology of law "against the pull of the large disciplines of sociology on the one side and law on the other" and became one of the pioneers of the sociology of law after World War II.

He carried out a systematic programme of socio-legal research throughout his academic life, wrote and published widely in both Polish and English and developed a unique socio-legal line of inquiry which can be traced back to Leon Petrazycki’s theory of “intuitive law”.  According to Adam Czarnota, Podgórecki developed his social theory “in opposition to the Marxist theory of law and the state. He stressed the importance of empirical comparative material guided by theoretical hypothesis. Crucial for him was the typology, derived from Petrazycki, of intuitive and official law”.

To honour the significant contribution made by Adam Podgórecki to the development of sociology of law and to shape the history of the Research Committee on Sociology of Law, its board decided in 2004 to establish the annual Adam Podgórecki Prize. It is awarded for outstanding achievements in socio-legal research.

References
 Czarnota, Adam "Podgórecki, Adam" in Encyclopedia of Law and Society: American and Global Perspectives (Thousand Oaks: SAGE).
 Podgórecki, Adam (1993) Polish Society. Praeger.
 Podgórecki, Adam (1991) A Sociological Theory of Law. Milano: Dott. A. Giuffre Editore.
 Podgórecki, Adam et al. (eds.) (1985) Social Systems and Legal Systems. London: Crom Helm.
 Podgórecki, Adam (1981) The Polish Burial of Marxist Ideology. London Poets and Painters Press.
 Podgórecki, Adam (1980) “Unrecognized Father of Sociology of Law: Leon Petrazycki.” Law and Society Review 15: 183-202.
 Podgórecki, Adam and M. Los (1979) Multidimen Sociology. London: Routledge and Keagan Paul.
 Podgórecki, Adam (1973) Knowledge and Opinion about Law. London: M. Robertson.
 Podgórecki, Adam (1974) Law and Society. London: Routledge.
 Podgórecki, Adam (1990) The Reflections and Oracles of Si-Tien. Ottawa: Carlton University Press.
 Ziegert, Klaus A. (1977) "Adam Podgórecki's Sociology of Law: The Invisible Factors of the Functioning of Law Made Visible" in Law and Society Review 12: 151-80.

External links
Adam Podgórecki Prize: http://www.isa-sociology.org/rc12_prize.htm

Notes

1998 deaths
1925 births
Sociologists of law